Sweatt may refer to:

People
 Bill Sweatt, American ice hockey player
 George Sweatt, American baseball player
 Lee Sweatt, American ice hockey player
 Thomas Sweatt, American serial arsonist
 W. R. Sweatt, American industrialist

Places
 Mount Sweatt, a mountain in Antarctica

Other
 Sweatt v. Painter, U.S. Supreme Court case on racial segregation